John Legh (1668–1739), of Adlington, Cheshire, was an English Member of Parliament  for Bodmin in Cornwall in 1715–1722.

References

1668 births
1739 deaths
People from Cheshire
Members of the Parliament of Great Britain for constituencies in Cornwall